Edward Healy Thompson (1813, Oakham, Rutland - 21 May 1891, Cheltenham, Gloucestershire) was an English  Roman Catholic writer.

Life
Thompson was the son of Robert and Mary Costall Thompson. His father was a tax surveyor successively at Oakham, Bath, and Salisbury. The poet Francis Thompson was his nephew.

He was educated at Oakham School and Emmanuel College, Cambridge. Having taken Anglican orders, he obtained a curacy at Calne, Wiltshire.
The clergyman poet William Lisle Bowles was a neighbour in nearby Bremhill.

After some years of the Anglican ministry at Marylebone, Ramsgate, and elsewhere, he became a Catholic in 1846. He published as his defence, "Remarks on certain Anglican Theories of Unity" (1846).

In 1851, jointly with James Spencer Northcote he undertook the editorship of the series of controversial pamphlets known as The Clifton Tracts. He was a contributor and sub-editor of the Dublin Review from 1863 to early 1865, but he and Henry James Coleridge left when editor William George Ward refused to publish a major article on the reviews of John Henry Newman's Apologia Pro Vita Sua. Ward was inclined to give the book as little publicity as possible.

In the mid-1880s, he lived on Hinde Street, Manchester Square. He was a contributor to Wilfrid Meynell's Merrie England magazine. The latter years of his life, which were spent at Cheltenham, he devoted to religious literature.

Works
"The Unity of the Episcopate considered" (1847); and 
"A few earnest thoughts on the Duty of Communion with the Catholic Church" (1847).

His chief works were:

lives of Jean-Jacques Olier (1861), Marie Harpain (1869), St. Stanislaus Kostka (1869), Baron de Rentz (1873), and Henri-Marie Boudon (1881); 
"Devotion to the Nine Choirs of Holy Angels" (1869); 
"The Life and Glories of St. Joseph" (1888); and 
"Before and After Gunpowder Plot" (1890).

Thompson was a promoter of Catholic literature. Most of this work consisted in the adaptations of foreign books which he thought were of value to English-speaking Catholics.

Family
On 30 July 1844 at Marylebone, he married Harriet Diana Calvert, daughter of Nicholson Calvert of Hunsdon and Frances Pery, daughter and co-heir of the Viscount Pery. Born at Hunsdon, Hertfordshire, 1811; Harriet died at Cheltenham, Gloucestershire, 21 Aug., 1896. On her husband's conversion she also joined the Catholic Church, and like him devoted herself to literary work. Her chief work is the "Life of Charles Borromeo", but she also wrote stories of Catholic life. These include: "Mary, Star of the Sea" (1848); "The Witch of Malton Hill"; "Mount St. Lawrence" (1850); "Winefride Jones" (1854); "Margaret Danvers" (1857); "The Wyndham Family" (1876); and others, as well as articles in the Dublin Review.

References

Sources

 
  
 

1813 births
1891 deaths
English writers
People educated at Oakham School
People from Oakham
British Roman Catholic writers
19th-century English Anglican priests
Anglican priest converts to Roman Catholicism
Alumni of Emmanuel College, Cambridge